The Hoback Formation is a geologic formation in west-central Wyoming, located within the Hoback Basin (directly north of the Green River Basin). It formed as a result of increased sedimentation rates from the Laramide Orogeny and preserves fossils dating back to the late Paleogene period, through the early Eocene.

The Hoback Formation was likely formed in a forested floodplain environment during a period of humid climate, as indicated by plentiful coal, carbonaceous shale, and fossilized plant remains. Many of the beds observed are dull in color, indicating that they formed in a reducing environment - another sign of a floodplain depositional environment, as standing water and waterlogged soil would be present for a substantial portion of the year. A prominent sandstone facies (with crossbedding, overbank deposits, and large pebbly deposits), thought to represent a large stream, is also present through much of the formation.

Fossils found within the Hoback Formation include bone fragments, turtles, larger mammals, molluscs, scales, fish teeth, and a wide variety of fossilized plant material (including fossilized wood). Signs of early Cenozoic crocodiles have also been found.

See also

 List of fossiliferous stratigraphic units in Wyoming
 Paleontology in Wyoming

References

 

Paleogene geology of Wyoming